Timiryazevo is a rural locality (a settlement) and the administrative center of Timiryazevskoye Rural Settlement, Novousmansky District, Voronezh Oblast, Russia. The population was 750 as of 2010. There are 11 streets.

Geography 
Timiryazevo is located 10 km southeast of Novaya Usman (the district's administrative centre) by road. Kazanskaya Khava is the nearest rural locality.

References 

Rural localities in Novousmansky District